Geartronic is Volvo Cars' name for its manumatic automatic transmission, similar to Porsche's Tiptronic. It is available in 4-, 5-, 6-, and 8-speed models, and is controlled by a microprocessor. The microprocessor automatically shifts to the next gear if a forgetful user in manual mode red lines the engine. Manual shifting is allowed with the gear stick in the manual mode. The gear stick can also be used just like any other automatic gearbox, where the transmission will shift automatically. 

Geartronic is offered on Volvo vehicles with engine displacements of 2.0 liters or greater. Geartronic transmissions are manufactured in Japan by Aisin AW. They require the use of automatic transmission fluid that meets the JWS 3309 specification. The MY2011 6-speed requires AW1.

Applications
Volvo C30
Volvo S40
Volvo V40
Volvo V50
Volvo V60
Volvo S60
Volvo C70
Volvo V70
Volvo S80
Volvo S90
Volvo XC40
Volvo XC60
Volvo XC70
Volvo XC90

Automatic transmission tradenames
Volvo Cars